Dees is a surname.  Notable people with the name include:

Archie Dees (1936–2016),American professional basketball player
Benny Dees (born 1936), American college basketball coach
Bill Dees (1939–2012), American musician
Bob Dees (1929–1997), American professional football player
Charlie Dees (born 1935), American professional baseball player
Dick Dees (born 1944), Dutch politician
Harry P. Dees (1912–2004), American lawyer
James Parker Dees (1915–1990), American founder and first bishop of the Anglican Orthodox Church and the Orthodox Anglican Communion
Julie Dees, also known as Julie McWhirter (born 1947) American voice actress
Mary Dees (1911–2004), American stage and screen actress
Morris Dees (born 1936), co-founder and chief trial counsel for the Southern Poverty Law Center
Rick Dees (born 1950), American comedic performer, entertainer, and radio personality
Robert F. Dees (born 1950), United States Army Brigadier General and Major General
Sam Dees (born 1945), American soul singer, songwriter and producer
Tony Dees (born 1963), American hurdler
William J. Dees (1874–1940), English boxer

See also
Dee
Deas
Dease (disambiguation)
Rick Dees Weekly Top 40, a radio program